Sabet Pasal is a historic palace located north of Nelson Mandela Boulevard in Tehran in Iran. Nicknamed the "Stone Palace" and  "Iran's palace of Versailles", it is Tehran's largest historical house.

History
The palace belonged to Habibollah Sabet (also known as Sabet Pasal), a rich Iranian businessman and the founder of Iran's first television station. The palace was seized by the Mostazafan Foundation during the Iranian Revolution and eventually became the property of Ali Ansari, managing director of Ayandeh Bank.

In 2015, the demolition of the palace was planned by the municipality. In May 2017, Iran's Ministry of Cultural Heritage, Handicrafts and Tourism obtained an agreement of non-demolition from the owner of the palace. On 12 June 2017, it was added to the Iran National Heritage List.

Description
Sabet Pascal was modeled after the Petit Trianon in Versailles.

Gallery

References

Buildings and structures in Tehran
Architecture in Iran
Palaces in Iran
Cultural heritage of Iran